Francine Charbonneau (born 22 March 1962) is a Canadian politician. Charbonneau was elected to represent the riding of Mille-Îles in the National Assembly of Quebec in the 2008 provincial election, and was then re-elected in 2012 and 2014. She is a member of the Quebec Liberal Party.

Prior to her election, Charbonneau was the president of the Laval School Board but was first elected to the board as commissioner in 1998 for the Sainte-Rose ward. She was a board member of various Laval associations including the regional development commission, Histoire Laval, the Regional Television and the Club des Petits dejeuners de Laval.

Electoral record

Source: Official Results, Le Directeur général des élections du Québec.

Source: Official Results, Le Directeur général des élections du Québec.

External links
 
 Liberal Party biography 

1962 births
Living people
Members of the Executive Council of Quebec
Politicians from Laval, Quebec
Politicians from Montreal
Quebec Liberal Party MNAs
Women government ministers of Canada
Women MNAs in Quebec
21st-century Canadian politicians
21st-century Canadian women politicians